"Body and Soul" is a popular song and jazz standard written in 1930 with music by Johnny Green and lyrics by Edward Heyman, Robert Sour and Frank Eyton. It was also used as the musical theme and underscoring in the American film noir boxing drama Body and Soul.

Background
"Body and Soul" was written in New York City for the British actress and singer Gertrude Lawrence, who introduced it to London audiences. Published in England, it was first performed in the United States by Libby Holman in the 1930 Broadway revue Three's a Crowd. In Britain the orchestras of Jack Hylton and Ambrose recorded the ballad first in the same week in February 1930. In the United States, the tune grew quickly in popularity, and by the end of 1930 at least 11 American bands had recorded it. Louis Armstrong was the first jazz musician to record "Body and Soul", in October 1930, but it was Paul Whiteman and Jack Fulton who popularized it in United States.

"Body and Soul" is one of the most recorded jazz standards, and multiple lyrics have been written for it.

Musical characteristics
"Body and Soul" is usually performed in the key of D-flat major. There is a verse that precedes the chorus, that  is rarely performed, although recordings by both Libby Holman and Billie Holiday include it. The main part of the tune consists of a repeated eight-bar melody, followed by an eight-bar bridge and a final eight-bar return to the melody. The 32-bar AABA form is typical of popular songs of the time. The "A" section uses conventional chord progressions including ii–V–I turnarounds in the home key of D flat, however the bridge is highly unusual in its tonal center shifts. It has been described as "a bridge like no other". "Body and Soul" is considered a challenging piece to solo over; however, the unusual nature of the chords provides a "large degree of improvisational freedom".

Notable recordings

Coleman Hawkins

One of the most famous and influential takes was recorded by Coleman Hawkins and His Orchestra on October 11, 1939, at their only recording session for Bluebird, a subsidiary of RCA Victor. The recording is unusual in that the song's melody is only hinted at in the recording; Hawkins' two-choruses of improvisation over the tune's chord progression constitute almost the entire take. Because of this, as well as the imaginative use of harmony and break from traditional swing cliches, the recording is recognised as part of the "early tremors of bebop". In 2004, the Library of Congress entered it into the National Recording Registry.

Tony Bennett and Amy Winehouse

"Body and Soul" was recorded as a duet by Tony Bennett and Amy Winehouse on March 23, 2011. It was the final recording made by Winehouse before her death on July 23, 2011, at the age of 27. The single was released worldwide on September 14, 2011, what would have been her 28th birthday, on iTunes, MTV and VH1.

When the song reached number 87 on the Billboard Hot 100 for the week of October 1, 2011, it made Bennett, at age 85, the oldest living artist to chart on the Hot 100. It also gave Bennett the longest overall span of appearances on the Hot 100; his version of "Young and Warm and Wonderful" appeared on the very first Hot 100 chart, for the week of August 4, 1958. The song received a Grammy Award at the 54th Grammy Awards in the Best Pop Duo/Group Performance category on February 12, 2012. Proceeds from "Body and Soul" go to benefit The Amy Winehouse Foundation, an organisation created to raise awareness and support for young adults struggling with addiction.

See also
List of 1930s jazz standards

References

1930 songs
1930 singles
1930s jazz standards
2010 songs
Grammy Hall of Fame Award recipients
Grammy Award for Best Pop Duo/Group Performance
Songs with music by Johnny Green
Songs with lyrics by Edward Heyman
United States National Recording Registry recordings
2011 singles
Jazz compositions in D-flat major
Amy Winehouse songs
Tony Bennett songs
Bluebird Records singles
Island Records singles
Sony Music singles